The abbreviation NLV may represent:
 New Life Version, a bible translation
 Nanosatellite launch vehicle, a vehicle
 North Las Vegas, Nevada, a city in Nevada
 Mykolaiv Airport, an airport
 Norwalk-like viruses, a classification of viruses
 National Library of Vietnam, a library
 Northern Lighthouse Vessel
 New London Vernacular, a recent style of architecture that has emerged in London